Jane Kristen Marczewski (December 29, 1990 – February 19, 2022), known professionally as Nightbirde, was an American singer-songwriter.

Previously having released two EPs and several singles, Nightbirde auditioned on America's Got Talent in 2021, where she received a Golden Buzzer for her original song "It's OK". However, she decided to withdraw from  AGT before the quarterfinals, because of worsening health due to cancer. Marczewski died on February 19, 2022, after keeping the battle to cancer a secret. She was 31 years old.

Early life and education 
Marczewski was born on December 29, 1990. She was originally from Zanesville, Ohio, and had three siblings. Marczewski started songwriting at age six, when she helped her mother finish the lyrics for a song. As a young Christian, she volunteered and participated in various church ministries.

Marczewski was a 2009 graduate of Licking County Christian Academy, and graduated from Liberty University (in Lynchburg, Virginia) with a marketing communications degree.

Music career 
Marczewski uploaded her first songs, and gave her first live performance in 2011, while a student at Liberty University. She released a three-song EP in 2012, called Lines, on which she sang and played acoustic guitar. In 2013, she released Ocean & Sky, a six-song EP that she funded on Kickstarter.

Remaining in Lynchburg after graduating, Marczewski was a popular performer locally. She returned to Ohio in 2014, and following her marriage, moved in 2015 to Nashville, Tennessee (where she later resumed performing under her married name, Jane Claudio, with her husband acting as her producer). Credited as Jane Marczewski-Claudio, she contributed music for the 2015 documentary film, Leonard Knight: A Man & His Mountain.

Nightbirde adopted her professional stage name based on a recurring dream, in which birds sang outside her window at night in anticipation of the morning. She explained: "It felt so poetic that these birds were singing as if it were morning, and yet there was no sign of it yet, and that’s what I want to embody." When asked the meaning behind her name by a fan on Instagram, Nightbirde responded:

Nightbirde's style, a mix of folk and pop, evolved into electropop. Her first single as Nightbirde was "Girl in a Bubble", released in March 2019, along with a music video. In April 2019, she opened for Tori Kelly at Liberty University. In August 2020, following her second cancer diagnosis and remission, she released "It's OK" (her most popular song).

Nightbirde peaked at No. 3 on the Billboard "Emerging Artists" chart in June 2021. Her song "New Year's Eve (The Remix)" peaked at No. 14 on iTunes in December 2021. It also charted in the United Kingdom, Canada and Australia. In March 2022, Nightbirde's song "It's OK" appeared during an episode of Good Trouble. Her 2021 song "Brave" was officially released posthumously as a single in April 2022. Her 2019 song "Fly" was officially released as a single by her family on July 4, 2022.

America's Got Talent 
In June 2021, Nightbirde performed during the 16th season auditions on America's Got Talent. During her appearance, she offered two inspirational statements:

 Nightbirde subsequently received a Golden Buzzer from Simon Cowell for her performance of her original song "It's OK". The song became No. 1 on iTunes and No. 2 trending on YouTube.

In August 2021, before she could compete in the show's quarterfinal round, Nightbirde withdrew from the competition because of worsening health. Cowell encouraged her not to return to the competition, saying "You don't need the stress right now." She appeared via remote broadcast during the live quarterfinals of AGT to express gratitude, and gave an update about her health on August 11, 2021.

In an interview with Entertainment Tonight, Cowell said Nightbirde could have gone all the way and been crowned champion, if it had been possible. In July 2022, Cowell ranked his favorite Top 15 Golden Buzzer moments in AGT history during season 17, and Nightbirde placed first.

Personal life 
Marczewski was married to musician Jeremy Claudio. The couple separated and divorced in 2020, after which she moved from Nashville to Long Beach, California (where she was baptized).

Nightbirde sold merchandise on social media, and raised money for medical expenses via GoFundMe. She also wrote poetry and painted prior to her death. Frequently posting, the singer's final message and selfie to social media was on January 11, 2022.

Health and death 
Marczewski was diagnosed with breast cancer in 2017, and declared cancer-free in July 2018. Her cancer recurred in 2019, and she was given three to six months to live, but she was again declared cancer-free in 2020. Prior to her America's Got Talent audition, Marczewski was told that the cancer had metastasized to her lungs, spine and liver. With only a 2% chance of survival, she gave health updates on CNN and social media. According to Nightbirde: "I have a two percent chance of survival, but two percent is not zero percent. Two percent is something, and I wish people knew how amazing it is."

At the age of 31, Marczewski died from the disease on February 19, 2022. She was surrounded by family in her San Clemente residence. The AGT judges and host released condolences on social media. A celebration of life, which was livestreamed, was held at Cornerstone Church in Ohio on March 4, 2022.

Legacy and honors 
The Marczewski family created The Nightbirde Memorial Fund (nightbirdefoundation.org), a foundation that donates to cancer research, and will help support those unable to afford the treatment they need.

America's Got Talent: Extreme honored Nightbirde at the end of the "Auditions 2" episode on February 28, 2022. A title card with a photo of her read: "In Memory of Jane 'Nightbirde' Marczewski".

Inspired by Nightbirde, the Lebanese dance group Mayyas (who received a Golden Buzzer from Sofía Vergara) honored her during the audition episode of AGT's season 17 on June 21, 2022. Nightbirde's song "It's OK" also played in the background, during the beginning and ending of their performance.

An emotional tribute to Nightbirde was highlighted during an America's Got Talent special on July 5, 2022. Judge Simon Cowell and host Terry Crews featured their favorite Golden Buzzer winners, with Nightbirde being ranked the best moment (No. 1), on the retrospective episode.

Discography

EPs 
As Jane Marczewski:

Lines (2012) 
Ocean & Sky (2013)

Singles 
As Nightbirde:

Note: "Fly" and "Brave" were officially released as singles posthumously in 2022.

See also 
 America's Got Talent (season 16)

References

External links 

 
 

1990 births
2022 deaths
21st-century American singers
21st-century American women singers
American women singer-songwriters
America's Got Talent contestants
Deaths from breast cancer
People from Zanesville, Ohio
Liberty University alumni
Singer-songwriters from Ohio
Deaths from cancer in California